Pattani Football Club (Thai:สโมสรฟุตบอลจังหวัดปัตตานี ) is a Thailand semi professional Association football club based in Pattani Province. The club is currently playing in the Thai League 3 Southern region.

Timeline

History of events of Pattani Football Club

Stadium and locations

Season by season record

Players

Current squad

Alliance clubs
 Buriram United F.C.
 Songkhla United F.C.
 Nara United F.C.
 Kelantan FA

References

External links 
 Official Website
 Official Facebookpage

Football clubs in Thailand
Association football clubs established in 2009
Sport in Pattani province
2009 establishments in Thailand